What's Your Pleasure? is the fourth studio album by English singer-songwriter Jessie Ware, released on 26 June 2020 by PMR Records and Virgin EMI Records. Ware and co-producer James Ford co-wrote all tracks, along with writers and producers Benji B, Joseph Mount, Kindness, Morgan Geist, Matthew Tavares and Midland.

The album received widespread critical acclaim. It was also a commercial success, earning Ware her first top-three entry and, to date, her highest peak position on both the UK Albums Chart and Scottish Albums Chart. Five singles have been released to promote the album. In April 2021, What's Your Pleasure? was nominated for Album of the Year at the Brit Awards. A reissue subtitled The Platinum Pleasure Edition, was released on 11 June 2021 and preceded by the singles "Please" and "Hot n Heavy".

Background 
After the promotional cycle for her previous album Glasshouse, Ware felt pressured to quit music due to low album sales and her exhaustion with touring. However, Ware's podcast Table Manners gained a larger following of 13 million listeners and soon became Ware's main priority. Speaking to The Independent, Ware described the podcast's success as a "turning point" that changed her outlook of herself: "I suddenly felt more comfortable in my skin." With the podcast, Ware discusses more personal topics that she felt forced to publicise with her music.

Upon the announcement of the release of the album in February 2020, Ware described the album as a "two-year labour of love", further citing the album as her visions of "escapism [and] groove". The twelve tracks on What's Your Pleasure? move away from her usual "melancholy" sound in her previous releases, to focus on disco, hi-NRG, and house. With Ford co-producing the album, Ware intended to pay homage to what the duo called "wedding jams", along with the soul of late American singer-songwriter Minnie Riperton, and the New York underground disco scene.

Release 
What's Your Pleasure? was initially scheduled to be released on 5 June 2020; however, the date was moved to 19 June due to the COVID-19 pandemic. Ware then announced that she would be pushing the release date back another week so as not to conflict with Juneteenth. The album was released on 26 June 2020, making it her first major release since Glasshouse (2017), and subsequently her first release after giving birth to her second child. Music videos were released for the title track, "Soul Control", "Step into My Life", "In Your Eyes", and "The Kill".

The cover art for the record sees Ware sport red lipstick, a black shirt and a golden necklace, with Pitchfork calling it a "spitting image" of Polaroids taken by American artist Andy Warhol of former actress Bianca Jagger.

On 8 January 2021, Ware confirmed the forthcoming release of a deluxe edition of the album on Twitter. Just before the album's release, Ware announced that she would embark on her UK eponymous headline tour, starting in April 2021. Ware promoted the album through virtual performances, aired by several television programmes, due to the COVID-19 pandemic.

What's Your Pleasure features elements of disco, post-disco, funk, Italo disco, Hi-NRG, rave, deep house, acid house, electro, new wave, trip hop, R&B, gospel, chamber folk, and soul.

On 11 June 2021, a reissue subtitled The Platinum Pleasure Edition was released, with an original cover art in greyscale with a metallic silver background. The lead single from the Platinum Pleasure, "Please", was released on 28 April 2021.

Critical reception 

What's Your Pleasure? received widespread critical acclaim. It was praised for its "disco-inspired" sound and cited as the singer's "finest" work. Ware earned praise for "going back to where she started" and for sounding "bolder, looser" compared to her previous releases. At Metacritic, which assigns a weighted average rating out of 100 to reviews from mainstream publications, the album received an average score of 84, based on 17 reviews, indicating "universal acclaim". Aggregator AnyDecentMusic? gave What's Your Pleasure? 8.3 out of 10, based on their assessment of the critical consensus.

Tara Joshi of The Guardian praised the upbeat nature of What's Your Pleasure? and compared it to other "grown-up disco" albums like Lady Gaga's Chromatica and Robyn's Honey. NME editor Hannah Mylrea claimed the album was a return to Ware's club roots, which she had strayed away from since her debut Devotion, and called it "an intoxicating cocktail of seductive beats, exhilarating choruses and sleek production." Owen Myers of Pitchfork complimented the album's musical references to disco divas of the past like Donna Summer, Diana Ross, and Anita Ward and awarded it the website's Best New Music distinction. Myers remarked positively on Ware's commitment to making uplifting music while allowing "a little of her signature psychodrama to creep into the nocturnal escapades she describes, and the flecks of ennui make the highs even higher."

Andy Kellman of AllMusic singled out "Mirage (Don't Stop)" as a highlight, praising the Bananarama-influenced production, as well as praising the production of the album as a whole. Kellman also praised the "chamber folk-soul" of the album's closer "Remember Where You Are", calling it a "stirring finale".

In July 2020, What's Your Pleasure? was included on Slant Magazines list of the best albums of 2020 so far.

Accolades

Commercial performance 
According to the Official Charts Company, What's Your Pleasure? was the most downloaded album over the weekend upon its initial release on 26 June 2020. The album eventually debuted at number three on both the UK Albums Chart and Scottish Albums Chart, giving Ware her fourth consecutive top-ten entry on the former and her first top-three entry on both. By this, the album became Ware's highest peak position on both charts, surpassing the number five peak and number twenty-six peak achieved by her debut album, Devotion (2012). The album is also Ware's first top-forty entry on the Belgian Albums (Ultratop Flanders) chart since Tough Love (2014), debuting at number thirty-six. It was also her first release to spend more than one week within the top ten of the UK Albums Chart, as it reached number seven upon its Platinum Pleasure re-release on 11 June 2021, nearly one year after its original release.

Track listing

Notes
  signifies an additional producer
 The song "Mirage (Don't Stop)" contains elements of the song "Cruel Summer" performed by Bananarama.

Personnel
Credits adapted from the liner notes of What's Your Pleasure?

Musicians

 Jessie Ware – vocals 
 James Ford – keyboards, percussion, programming ; synths ; guitar, bass, drums 
 Dave Okumu – guitar 
 Leo Taylor – drums 
 Shungudzo – backing vocals 
 Danny Parker – backing vocals 
 Bim Amoako – backing vocals 
 Senab Adekunle – backing vocals 
 Morgan Geist – programming 
 Midland – synths, programming 
 Joseph Mount – keyboards, programming 
 Adam Bainbridge – keyboards, programming 
 Clarence Coffee Jr. – backing vocals 
 Jules Buckley – string and brass arrangements, conducting
 Tom Pigott-Smith (leader), Lizzie Ball, Marianne Haynes, Laura Melhuish, Kate Robinson, Charlie Brown, Nicky Sweeney, Jeremy Isaac, Hannah Dawson, Oli Langford – violins
 Vicci Wardman, Helen Kamminga, Reiad Chibah – violas
 Ian Burdge, Chris Worsey, Katherine Jenkinson – cellos
 Richard Pryce – double bass
 Richard Watkins, Nigel Black – French horns
 Tom Walsh, Louis Dowdeswell, Andy Wood – trumpets, flugelhorns
 Callum Au – tenor trombone
 Dave Stewart – bass trombone

Technical

 James Ford – production, recording ; mixing 
 Morgan Geist – production 
 Joseph Mount – production, recording 
 Adam Bainbridge – production 
 Benji B – production 
 Matthew Tavares – production 
 Midland – additional production 
 Joe LaPorta – mastering
 Billy Foster – engineering assistance
 Matt Jaggar – engineering assistance
 Lewis Jones – string and brass recording
 George Oulton – engineering assistance

Artwork
 Mat Maitland – creative direction
 Dan Sanders – commission, creative
 Rory Dewar – artwork
 Carlijn Jacobs – photography
 Suzanne Beirne – set design

Charts

Certifications

Release history

Notes

References

2020 albums
Jessie Ware albums
Albums postponed due to the COVID-19 pandemic
Disco albums by English artists
Funk albums by English artists
Post-disco albums
PMR Records albums
Virgin EMI Records albums